Githunguri Constituency is an electoral constituency in Kenya. It is one of twelve constituencies in Kiambu County. The entire constituency is located within Kiambu County Council. The constituency was established for the 1963 elections.

Members of Parliament

Locations and wards

References 

Constituencies in Kiambu County
Constituencies in Central Province (Kenya)
1963 establishments in Kenya
Constituencies established in 1963